Summit Behavioral Healthcare (Summit BHC) is a Brentwood, Tennessee-based behavioral health services company that owns and operates 18 addiction treatment centers throughout the United States.

Background
Originating in 2012, the company was founded by Trey Carter, former CEO of Acadia Healthcare. In March 2015, Chicago, IL based investment firm Flexpoint Ford provided Round 1 funding to launch Summit BHC's growth plan.

Summit BHC acquired The Ranch at Dove Tree, a Lubbock, Texas-based addiction treatment center, in July 2015. The company also purchased Seabrook West, a Westfield, Pennsylvania-based addiction treatment center in December, 2015.

References

External links
Health & Fitness Guide
Addiction Treatment Rehabs

Drug and alcohol rehabilitation centers
Addiction organizations in the United States
Mental health organizations in Tennessee